Conrad F. Becker (November 12, 1905 – August 14, 1965) was an American businessman and politician.

Born in Red Bud, Illinois, Becker worked in his family's business C. Becker Milling Company. He was also involved with the banking business. Becker played baseball with semi-pro baseball teams in southern Illinois. He was offered a contract with the St. Louis Cardinals and of which he declined because of his involvement with his family's business. From 1937 to 1941, he served as Mayor of Red Bud, Illinois and was a Republican. From 1942 to 1944, Becker was the warden of the Southern Illinois Penitentiary in Menard, Illinois. From 1945 to 1947, Becker served as Illinois Treasurer. He died at his in-law's home in New Haven, Missouri in 1965.

Notes

1905 births
1965 deaths
People from Red Bud, Illinois
American prison wardens
Businesspeople from Illinois
Baseball players from Illinois
Illinois Republicans
Mayors of places in Illinois
State treasurers of Illinois
20th-century American businesspeople
20th-century American politicians